David D. Pollard (born October 12, 1943) is a professor in geomechanics and structural geology at Stanford University.

Career
David Pollard teaches an undergraduate course, Fundamentals of Structural Geology, and is writing an undergraduate textbook in structural geology. He teaches graduate-level courses in structural geology, rock mechanics, and rock fracture mechanics.

Professional activities
 Morris Professor of Earth Sciences, Stanford University, August 1983 – present
 Geophysicist and Project Chief, US Geological Survey (USGS), July 1974 – August 1983
 Assistant Professor, University of Rochester, September 1970 – June 1974
 Member, editorial advisory board, Journal of Structural Geology.
 Developer of Poly3D, a boundary element computer program to analyse faults and fractures.
 Co-founder of IGEOSS, a French company developing software for the hydrocarbon industry (acquired by Schlumberger in 2010).
 Author and producer of A Complete Suite, a musical allegory exploring uses of continuum mechanics in structural geology.
 Editor, New Departures in Structural Geology and Tectonics, an NSF-sponsored white paper on research opportunities.
 Fellow of the Geological Society of America and of the American Geophysical Union.

Books 
 Fundamentals of Structural Geology, 2005, published by Cambridge University Press, along with co-authors Fletcher R.
 Structural Geology: A Quantitative Introduction, 2020, published by Cambridge University Press, along with co-authors Stephen J. Martel.

Honors and awards 
Wollaston Medal of the Geological Society of London (2021) 
Career Contribution Award, Structural Geology and Tectonics Division, Geological Society of America (2016)
Best Paper of the Year Award, Structural Geology and Tectonics Division, Geological Society of America (2007)
Fellow, American Geophysical Union (2007–Present)
Fellow, Geological Society of America (1996–Present)
Woodford-Eckis Lectureship, Pomona College (1996)
Barney and Estelle Morris Professor of Earth Sciences, Stanford University (1993–Present)
Senior Hess Fellow, Princeton University (1992)
Centennial Author, Geological Society of America Bulletin (1988)
Outstanding Teacher Award, School of Earth Sciences, Stanford University (1987–1988)
Applied Research Award, U. S. National Committee on Rock Mechanics (1987)
Post-doctoral Fellowship, National Science Foundation (1968–1969)
Graduate Fellowship, National Science Foundation (1965–1968)
R.W. Strehle Memorial Award in Geology, Pomona College (1965)

Notable publications

 Pollard, DD, Johnson, AM, 1973, Mechanics of growth of some laccolithic intrusions in Henry mountains, Utah .2. Bending and failure of overburden layers and sill formation, Tectonophysics  Volume: 18   Issue: 3–4   Pages: 311–354
 DD Pollard, 1973, Derivation and evaluation of a mechanical model for sheet intrusions, Tectonophysics 19 (3), 233–269
 P Segall, DD Pollard, 1980, Mechanics of discontinuous faults, Journal of Geophysical Research: Solid Earth 85(B8), 4337–4350 
 RC Fletcher, DD Pollard, 1981, Anticrack model for pressure solution surfaces, Geology 9 (9), 419–424
 DD Pollard, P Segall, PT Delaney, 1982, Formation and interpretation of dilatant echelon cracks, Geological Society of America Bulletin 93 (12), 1291–1303
 DD Pollard, 1987, Elementary fracture mechanics applied to the structural interpretation of dykes, Mafic dyke swarms 34, 5–24
 DD Pollard, A Aydin, 1988, Progress in understanding jointing over the past century, Geological Society of America Bulletin 100(8), 1181–1204
 J Olson, DD Pollard, 1989, Inferring paleostresses from natural fracture patterns: A new method, Geology 17 (4), 345–348
 MA Antonellini, A Aydin, DD Pollard, 1994, Microstructure of deformation bands in porous sandstones at Arches National Park, Utah, Journal of structural geology 16 (7), 941–959
 R Bürgmann, DD Pollard, SJ Martel, 1994, Slip distributions on faults: effects of stress gradients, inelastic deformation, heterogeneous host-rock stiffness, and fault interaction, Journal of Structural Geology 16 (12), 1675–1690
 Wu, Hq, Pollard, DD, 1995, An experimental-study of the relationship between joint spacing and layer thickness, Journal of Structural Geology  Volume: 17   Issue: 6   Pages: 887–905
 H Wu, DD Pollard, 1995, An experimental study of the relationship between joint spacing and layer thickness, Journal of Structural Geology 17 (6), 887–905
 EJM Willemse, DD Pollard, A Aydin, 1996, Three-dimensional analyses of slip distributions on normal fault arrays with consequences for fault scaling, Journal of Structural Geology 18 (2), 295–309
 Willemse, EJM, Pollard, DD, Aydin, 1996, A, Three-dimensional analyses of slip distributions on normal fault arrays with consequences for fault scaling, Journal of Structural Geology  Volume: 18   Issue: 2–3   Pages: 295–309
 ML Cooke, DD Pollard, 1996, Fracture propagation paths under mixed mode loading within rectangular blocks of polymethyl methacrylate, Journal of Geophysical Research: Solid Earth (1978–2012) 101 (B2), 3387–3400
 JG Crider, DD Pollard, 1998, Fault linkage: three‐dimensional mechanical interaction between echelon normal faults, Journal of Geophysical Research: Solid Earth (1978–2012) 103 (B10), 24373-24391
 L Maerten, EJM Willemse, DD Pollard, K Rawnsley, 1999, Slip distributions on intersecting normal faults, Journal of Structural Geology 21 (3), 259–272
 T Bai, DD Pollard, 2000, Fracture spacing in layered rocks: a new explanation based on the stress transition, Journal of Structural Geology 22 (1), 43–57
 T Bai, DD Pollard, H Gao, 2000, Explanation for fracture spacing in layered materials, Nature 403 (6771), 753–756
 L Maerten, DD Pollard, F Maerten, 2001, Digital mapping of three-dimensional structures of the Chimney Rock fault system, central Utah, Journal of Structural Geology 23 (4), 585–592
 L Maerten, P Gillespie, DD Pollard, 2002, Effects of local stress perturbation on secondary fault development, Journal of Structural Geology 24 (1), 145–153
 KR Sternlof, JW Rudnicki, DD Pollard, 2005, Anticrack inclusion model for compaction bands in sandstone, Journal of Geophysical Research: Solid Earth (1978–2012) 110 (B11)
 F Maerten, P Resor, D Pollard, L Maerten, 2005, Inverting for slip on three-dimensional fault surfaces using angular dislocations, Bulletin of the Seismological Society of America 95 (5), 1654–1665
 N Bellahsen, P Fiore, DD Pollard, 2006, The role of fractures in the structural interpretation of Sheep Mountain Anticline, Wyoming, Journal of Structural Geology 28 (5), 850–867
 I Mynatt, S Bergbauer, DD Pollard, 2007, Using differential geometry to describe 3-D folds, Journal of Structural Geology 29 (7), 1256–1266
 WA Griffith, G Di Toro, G Pennacchioni, DD Pollard, 2008, Thin pseudotachylytes in faults of the Mt. Abbot quadrangle, Sierra Nevada: Physical constraints for small seismic slip events, Journal of Structural Geology 30 (9), 1086–1094
 GE Hilley, I Mynatt, DD Pollard, 2010, Structural geometry of Raplee Ridge monocline and thrust fault imaged using inverse Boundary Element Modeling and ALSM data, Journal of Structural Geology 32 (1), 45–58
 JO Kaven, F Maerten, DD Pollard, 2011, Mechanical analysis of fault slip data: Implications for paleostress analysis, Journal of structural geology 33 (2), 78–91
 E Ritz, DD Pollard, 2012, Stick, slip, and opening of wavy frictional faults: A numerical approach in two dimensions, Journal of Geophysical Research: Solid Earth (1978–2012) 117 (B3)
 C Meng, F Maerten, DD Pollard, 2013, Modeling mixed-mode fracture propagation in isotropic elastic three dimensional solid, International Journal of Fracture 179 (1–2), 45–57
 F Maerten, L Maerten, DD Pollard, 2014, iBem3D, a three-dimensional iterative boundary element method using angular dislocations for modeling geologic structures, Computers & Geosciences 72, 1–17
 F Maerten, EH Madden, DD Pollard, L Maerten, 2016, Incorporating fault mechanics into inversions of aftershock data for the regional remote stress, with application to the 1992 Landers, California earthquake, Tectonophysics, 674, 52–64

Notes

External links
 The Barney and Estelle Morris Professor of Earth Sciences, Emeritus
 David D Pollard – Google Scholar Citations

1943 births
Stanford University faculty
Living people
Pomona College alumni
Stanford University alumni
Alumni of the University of London